Babelomurex bernardi is a species of sea snail, a marine gastropod mollusk, in the family Muricidae, the murex snails or rock snails.

Distribution
The holotype of this marine species was found off Gabon.

References

 Nicolay, K. & Bernard, P. A., 1984. New species of Gabon. La Conchiglia 180-181: 16-18
 Ardovini, R.; Cossignani, T. (2004). West African seashells (including Azores, Madeira and Canary Is.) = Conchiglie dell'Africa Occidentale (incluse Azzorre, Madeira e Canarie). English-Italian edition. L'Informatore Piceno: Ancona, Italy. . 319 pp

External links
 MNHN? Paris: holotype

bernardi
Gastropods described in 1984